The Fremantle tramway network linked the central business district of Fremantle, the port city for Perth, Western Australia, with nearby suburbs. Small but comprehensive, it operated between 1905 and 1952. It was not connected with the larger Perth tramway system.

History

The Fremantle Municipal Tramways (FMT) began operations on 30 October 1905. Prior to that date, there was no public transport system in Fremantle. The tram network expanded into North Fremantle in 1908, and into Melville in 1915. The North Fremantle line closed in 1938 and was replaced by diesel buses. The rest of the network reached its peak usage during World War II.

After World War II, the system operated quite profitably for the Council. However, the decision of the State Government to nationalise the south-west electricity systems from private and council ownership to the newly formed State Electricity Commission in the early 1950s meant that the price of power to the trams increased markedly, to the extent that supply was extremely costly to the Council.

As a result, and without any fanfare at all, the whole system was closed after the last tram ran into the Carbarn in Queen Victoria Street on 8 November 1952. The last Fremantle tram left the town on the back of a semi-trailer in March the following year.

Services

The original network
By the time Fremantle's tram network was fully operational in April 1906, it had four lines:

South (Route S)
High Street, via city loop (Phillimore Street), South Terrace and Mandurah Road (now part of South Terrace) to Douro Road, South Fremantle.

A combination of business and pleasure, this line connected central Fremantle with the South Beach foreshore. During the week, the South line served commuters heading towards Fremantle, and on summer weekends, people would travel from Perth and further afield to take the South line to South Beach. From 1907, the line included a short "city loop", running past the relocated Fremantle railway station in Phillimore Street.

In 1923, the facilities at South Beach were significantly expanded, with the opening of a Hydrodome. The South line remained open until the whole network was closed in 1952.

East (Route E)
High Street, Fremantle, via Adelaide Street and Canning Road (now Canning Highway) to Allen Street, East Fremantle.

In 1909, this line was extended to Petra Street, on the border between East Fremantle and Palmyra. On 15 December 1915, the Melville Roads Board opened a further extension along Canning Road, this time to the corner of Stock Road, Bicton.

Marmion (Route M)
High Street, Fremantle, via Marmion Street to Duke Street, Marmion (now East Fremantle).

In 1908, this line was extended along Marmion Street in an easterly direction, and then south to High Street, where it continued east to a new terminus at the Fremantle Cemetery, Carrington Street, East Fremantle. The line along Marmion Street was also later extended to McKimmie Street, Palmyra.

Beaconsfield (Route B)
High Street, Fremantle, via Hampton Street (now Hampton Road) to Beaconsfield public school, cnr Lefroy Road, Beaconsfield.

This line was later extended along Hampton Street, Wray Avenue and South Street to Central Avenue, and subsequently to Carrington Street, Beaconsfield.  It was closed in 1948.

Additional routes

North (Route N)
High Street, Fremantle, via Adelaide Street, the Swan River Bridge and the Perth-Fremantle Road (now Stirling Highway) to Leighton Street (now Leslie Road), North Fremantle.

On 30 September 1908, a new route to North Fremantle was added to the network. The North Fremantle route was owned and operated by the North Fremantle Municipality. It did not enjoy the same success as the original network, and was closed on 30 November 1938.

Point Walter
Canning Road, Bicton, via Point Walter Road, to Point Walter reserve, Bicton.

On 15 December 1915, simultaneously with its opening of the extension of the East line to Stock Road, Bicton, the Melville Roads Board opened a second new route, to Point Walter in Bicton. The opening of this route helped to develop Point Walter into a popular resort and place of entertainment. Along with the trams came electric lighting, and, soon afterwards, well patronised shops and restaurants. Entertainment at Point Walter included McNamara's Band. There were also panoramic views of the Swan River, frequently dotted with the sails of racing yachts.

Over time, increasing numbers of motor car owners chose to seek entertainment further away from Fremantle than Point Walter. As a result, the Point Walter resort fell into disrepair, and patronage on the Point Walter line declined. In 1939, the line was closed.

Fleet

A total of 36 trams entered service on the Fremantle tram network between 1905 and 1939. Most of them remained in service until 1949 or later. Unlike their Perth counterparts, the various classes of Fremantle tram were not officially allocated any class designator code. Each individual Fremantle tram was officially identified only by its unique number.
Most Fremantle trams fell into two main classes, with a small transitional group in between.

The first main Fremantle tram class, made up of tramcars 1 to 19, 24 and 25, was of single truck, drop end, open California combination tram cars. They entered service between 1905 and 1914.

Tramcars 20 to 23 were the transitional group. Each of them entered service between 1912 and 1915.

The second main class of Fremantle tram was made up of tramcars 26 to 36. They were bogie saloon cars, and entered service between 1921 and 1939.

The trams were manufactured by J.G. Brill Company in the United States and locally by Boltons and the Midland Railway Workshops, and by the FMT.

The dominant colour in the livery of every Fremantle tram was a shade of maroon. The single truck tramcars were also lined with pinstripes, and the bogie trams also painted a cream colour at window level.

Preserved trams
Fremantle's trams 14, 28, 29, 30 and 36 have been preserved by the Perth Electric Tramway Society at its heritage tramway in Whiteman Park.

Notes

Cited works

Further reading

External links

Fremantle
Fremantle
Public transport in Perth, Western Australia
Fremantle
3 ft 6 in gauge railways in Australia
1905 establishments in Australia
1952 disestablishments in Australia
History of rail transport in Western Australia